Pečnik is a small settlement in the hills above Spodnja Idrija in the Municipality of Idrija in the traditional Inner Carniola region of Slovenia.

References

External links

Pečnik on Geopedia

Populated places in the Municipality of Idrija